Mount Mandalagan is a complex volcano located at latitude 10.65° North (10°39'0"N), longitude 123.25° East (123°15'0"E), in the province of Negros Occidental, on the north of the island of Negros of the Philippines. It is located inside the Northern Negros Natural Park.

Mandalagan is a solfataric, fumarolic, potentially active stratovolcano.
Mandalagan is also known as Nahigda nga Babayi or Lying Women for the Bacolodnons and Negrenses.

Physical Features

Elevation is 1885 metres (6,184 feet), with a base diameter of 26 kilometres.

Mandalagan is a deeply dissected complex volcano, with a highly altered volcanic dome.

Volcanic activity is reported to include seven volcanic centres, at least five craters and/or calderas up to 2 km in diameter, and a vigorous solfataric area at the highly altered volcanic dome structure.

One solfataric area emits a high-temperature (106 degrees C) plume to 30 m height with a roaring noise like a high-pressure geothermal borehole.

Images

The Smithsonian listing has a satellite photograph of the general area.

Geological Features

Mandalagan is part of the Negros Volcanic Belt.

Rock type is principally andesitic with some dacitic

A crater located near the center called "Tinagong Dagat", where hikers camp.

Eruption

The most recent eruption produced a thin basaltic lava flow, but it is not known when this is likely to have occurred.

Listings

Philippine Institute of Volcanology and Seismology (PHIVOLCS) lists Mandalagan as potentially active.

The Smithsonian Global Volcanism Program lists Mandalagan as fumarolic.

See also
List of active volcanoes in the Philippines
List of potentially active volcanoes in the Philippines
List of inactive volcanoes in the Philippines
Philippine Institute of Volcanology and Seismology
Volcano

External links
Philippine Institute of Volcanology and Seismology (PHIVOLCS) Mandalagan Page

Volcanoes of Negros Island
Potentially active volcanoes of the Philippines
Stratovolcanoes of the Philippines
Subduction volcanoes
Landforms of Negros Occidental